The list of horn makers spans all time, and not all still exist.

 Andreas Jungwirth
 Atkinson Brass and Company
 Briz Horn Company
 Buescher Band Instrument Company
 C.G. Conn
 Christopher Cornford
 Dieter Otto
 Ed. Kruspe
 Engelbert Schmid
 F. E. Olds
 Finke
 Gebr. Alexander
 Hans Hoyer
 Herbert Fritz Knopf
 Holton
 Kalison
 Klaus Fehr
 Lewis & Duerk
 Lukas Horns
 Jacob Medlin, Greensboro, North Carolina
 Otto
 Patterson Hornworks
 Paxman Musical Instruments
 Ricco Kühn
 Stomvi
 Thein
 Yamaha Corporation

References

Lists of manufacturers
Music-related lists

sv:Lista över tillverkare av bleckblåsinstrument